The 1960 International cricket season was from April 1960 to August 1960.

Season overview

June

South Africa in England

July

Netherlands in Denmark

References

1960 in cricket